Donna Polseno is a contemporary American visual artist known for pottery, ceramics, and sculpture.

Background 
Donna Polseno earned her Bachelor of Fine Arts (1972) at the Kansas City Art Institute and her Master of Arts in Teaching (1974) at the Rhode Island School of Design. She lives and works in Floyd, Virginia and teaches ceramics at Hollins University in Roanoke, Virginia. Polseno is a founding member of the 16 Hands Studio Tour and director of the Women Working with Clay Symposium.

Selected solo and group exhibitions 

 16 Hands Studio Tour, held annually. Floyd, VA
Embodied Form, 2018. List Gallery at Swarthmore College, Swarthmore, PA
Reverences, 2009. Taubman Museum of Art, Roanoke, VA
For the Love of Flowers, 2005. Kentucky Museum of Art and Craft, Louisville, KY
Biennial of Piedmont Crafts, 1978. Mint Museum of Art, Charlotte, NC

Collections and publications 

 American Museum of Ceramic Art, Pomona, CA
 Ceramics Monthly, March 1990, November 2015

References 

21st-century American sculptors
20th-century American sculptors
Kansas City Art Institute alumni
Rhode Island School of Design alumni
Hollins University faculty
American potters
American ceramists
Living people
Year of birth missing (living people)
Place of birth missing (living people)
People from Floyd, Virginia
21st-century American women artists
20th-century American women artists
American women ceramists
American women sculptors
Women potters
American women academics
Sculptors from Virginia